Only the Names Have Been Changed is the solo debut album by Stereophonics frontman Kelly Jones.

Background
As Jones explains, "we were recording the sixth Stereophonics album...and in-between takes I started doing these songs off the cuff. Three or four tracks in I realised that this could actually be something...strange how it's always little things that makes big things happen. We didn't wait – it was recorded 7 and 8 January and mastered by Friday the 12th...every song is a live take...we actively decided to make it a bit more filmic. In two days we put down 10 tracks with 10 different girls names...we wanted to do something in the vein of Nick Cave's Murder Ballads or Johnny Cash's Blood, Sweat and Tears.

Track listing

References

2007 debut albums
V2 Records albums